The Stanton Library in North Sydney, NSW, Australia is the public library service of North Sydney Council. Established in 1964, it was named after the Mayor of North Sydney from 1937 to 1939, James Street Stanton, who was a supporter of the Free Library Movement.

History
In November 1943, three months after Stanton's death, North Sydney Council voted to create a library, with planning starting in 1945 on the "Stanton Memorial Library" as a part of a broader "Civic Centre" planned for the site on Miller Street bounded by Maclaren and Ridge streets at an estimated cost of £20,000. However, various delays including land acquisition issues meant that the "Civic Centre" plans never came to be fully realised, and the Stanton Library was not opened until 8 February 1964, when Governor Sir Eric Woodward performed the honours.

The first library building was of a striking modernist design, with a curtain wall facade. Designed by Council architect John L. Browne, it was built by J.P. Cordukes Pty. Ltd. of Concord, and the interior designed by Marion Hall Best. In 1987, mayor Ted Mack commissioned construction on alterations and additions to the 1964 library, designed by Feiko Bouman, which were completed in 1988.

References

Libraries in Sydney
Public libraries in Australia
North Sydney, New South Wales
North Sydney Council
Library buildings completed in 1964
Library buildings completed in 1988
1964 establishments in Australia
Libraries established in 1964
Modernist architecture in Australia
International Style (architecture)